The 2022 Lima Challenger was a professional tennis tournament played on clay courts. It was the 17th edition of the tournament which was part of the 2022 ATP Challenger Tour. It took place in Lima, Peru between 8 and 14 August 2022.

Singles main-draw entrants

Seeds

 1 Rankings are as of 1 August 2022.

Other entrants
The following players received wildcards into the singles main draw:
  Gianluca Ballotta
  Gonzalo Bueno
  Ignacio Buse

The following players received entry into the singles main draw as alternates:
  Alex Hernández
  Conner Huertas del Pino
  Patrick Kypson

The following players received entry from the qualifying draw:
  Ignacio Carou
  Tomás Farjat
  Juan Sebastián Gómez
  Juan Bautista Otegui
  Jorge Panta
  Eduardo Ribeiro

The following player received entry as a lucky loser:
  Alejandro Hoyos

Champions

Singles

  Camilo Ugo Carabelli def.  Thiago Agustín Tirante 6–2, 7–6(7–4).

Doubles

  Ignacio Carou /  Facundo Mena def.  Orlando Luz /  Camilo Ugo Carabelli 6–2, 6–2.

References

2022 ATP Challenger Tour
2022
August 2022 sports events in Peru
2022 in Peruvian sport